Sunday Mba (born 28 November 1988) is a Nigerian footballer who last played as a attacking midfielder for Yeni Malatyaspor and the Nigeria national team.

Club career
Mba joined Rangers on loan in May 2013 from Warri Wolves. He scored in his Rangers' debut, a 3–1 loss to Clube Recreativo Desportivo do Libolo in the 2013 CAF Champions League
He signed for Bastia in December after a drawn-out negotiation that lasted most of the year.

In October 2019, after 2 years without a club, he said he wanted to return to active football.

International career
He was a member of the Nigeria B team that won the 2010 WAFU Nations Cup. He made his senior debut in the Eagles' 0–0 tie against Angola in January 2012. He scored a brace against Liberia in his next game.

He was called up to Nigeria's 23-man squad for the 2013 Africa Cup of Nations. Mba scored the winning goal in Nigeria's 2–1 quarter-final win over Ivory Coast. On 10 February 2013, in the final against Burkina Faso, he scored the first and only goal of the game, to hand Nigeria their third Africa Cup of Nations title.

He was selected for Nigeria's squad at the 2013 FIFA Confederations Cup.

References

1988 births
Living people
Nigerian footballers
Nigeria international footballers
Nigerian expatriate footballers
Enyimba F.C. players
Rangers International F.C. players
Dolphin F.C. (Nigeria) players
Warri Wolves F.C. players
CA Bastia players
Yeni Malatyaspor footballers
Ligue 2 players
TFF First League players
2013 Africa Cup of Nations players
2013 FIFA Confederations Cup players
Africa Cup of Nations-winning players
Expatriate footballers in Turkey
People from Aba, Abia
Association football midfielders